Galina Karelina (born 23 November 1950) is a former pair skater who competed for the Soviet Union. With partner Georgi Proskurin, she is the 1971 European bronze medalist.

Results 
(with Proskurin)

References 

Soviet female pair skaters
Living people
European Figure Skating Championships medalists
Universiade medalists in figure skating
Universiade gold medalists for the Soviet Union
Universiade silver medalists for the Soviet Union
Competitors at the 1970 Winter Universiade
Competitors at the 1972 Winter Universiade
1950 births